This articles lists events from the year 2019 in Oman.

Incumbents
Sultan: Qaboos bin Said al Said
Prime Minister: Qaboos bin Said al Said

References

 
2010s in Oman
Years of the 21st century in Oman
Oman
Oman